Crocomela tenuifascia is a moth of the subfamily Arctiinae. It was described by Hering in 1925. It is found in Ecuador.

References

Arctiinae
Moths described in 1925